Eeva-Kaarina Aronen (30 December 1948 - 16 December 2015) was a Finnish author and journalist. Her novels were nominated for the Runeberg Prize and the Finlandia Prize.

Early life and education
Eeva-Kaarina “Epi” Aronen was born in Helsinki on 30 December 1948. She attended school in Töölö, received a bachelor's degree at the Helsingin yliopiston Viikin normaalikoulu in Helsinki in 1968, and graduated from the University of Helsinki in 1975 with a major in Romance philology and Russian Language and Literature. In the following year, she graduated as a journalist from Sanoma's School of Journalism.

Career
Aronen worked as a journalist on Helsingin Sanomat's "Monthly Supplement" from 1991 to 2008.

Aronen's first novel Maria Renforsin totuus ("Maria Renfors Truth") was published in 2005 and the second novel, Hän joka näkee ("She's Seeing") in 2007. Maria Renforsin totuus came out in 2007 in German under the name Die Lachsfischer; it was published by Lübbe and translated by Angela Plöger. Aronen was nominated for the Runeberg Prize in 2007. Hän joka näkee was published in German by Lübbe in August 2008 as a translation by Angela Plöger. Aronen's third novel Kallorumpu ("The Rock Drum") was released in 2011 and was nominated for the Finlandia Prize. Her last novel, Edda, was published in 2014.

She died from cancer in Helsinki on 16 December 2015.

Awards and honors
 2007, nominated for the Runeberg Prize
 2011, nominated for the Finlandia Prize

Selected works 
Maria Renforsin totuus (Teos, 2005)
Hän joka näkee (Teos, 2007)
Kallorumpu (Teos, 2011)
Edda (Teos 2014)

References

1948 births
2015 deaths
Writers from Helsinki
University of Helsinki alumni
20th-century  Finnish journalists
Finnish women journalists
21st-century Finnish novelists
21st-century Finnish women writers
Finnish women novelists
Deaths from cancer in Finland
21st-century Finnish journalists